Geoffrey of Brionne (mid-10th century – c. 1010), also called Godfrey was Count of Eu and Brionne in the late tenth and early eleventh centuries.

Life 
He was a son of  Duke Richard I of Normandy, by an unnamed wife or concubine. The county of Eu was an appanage created for Geoffrey by his half-brother Richard II of Normandy in 996 as part of Richard's policy of granting honors and titles for cadet members of his family. The citadel of Eu played a critical part of the defense of Normandy; the castle and walled town were on the river Bresle, just two miles from the English Channel. It had long been an embarkation point for England and in time of war was often one of the first places attacked.

The castle of Brionne had been held by the Dukes of Normandy as one of their own homes but Richard II also made a gift of Brionne to his half-brother Geoffrey, who held it for life passing it to his son Gilbert and was only returned to the demesne of the Duke after his murder.

Both Geoffrey and his son Gilbert are styled counts in a diploma to Lisieux given by Duke Richard II, but without territorial designations. Geoffrey died .

Issue 
Geoffrey was married but the name of his wife is unknown.  He was the father of:
 Gilbert, Count of Eu and Brionne
Upon his death, Geoffrey was succeeded as Count of Eu and Count of Brionne by his son Gilbert.

Notes

References 

Counts of Eu
10th-century births
Norman warriors
11th-century deaths
10th-century Normans
11th-century Normans